Madhurappathinezhu is a 1975 Indian Malayalam film,  directed by Hariharan and produced by T. E. Vasudevan. The film stars Raghavan, Sudheer, KP Ummer and Sumithra in the lead roles. The film has musical score by A. T. Ummer.

Cast

K. P. Ummer
Raghavan
Sudheer
Sumithra
Adoor Bhasi
Sankaradi
Sreelatha Namboothiri
Alummoodan
Meena
N. Govindankutty
Paravoor Bharathan

Soundtrack
The music was composed by A. T. Ummer and the lyrics were written by Sreekumaran Thampi.

References

External links
 

1975 films
1970s Malayalam-language films
Films directed by Hariharan